Sound Go Round is an album by Dressy Bessy. It was released in 2002 by Kindercore Records.

The Washington Post compared the sound of the album to the "acid-flavored 'gum" of sixties acts Strawberry Alarm Clock and Lemon Pipers.

Track listing
"I Saw Cinnamon" – 2:10
"Tag" – 0:42
"There's a Girl" – 3:00
"Just Being Me" – 2:49
"That's Why" – 2:23
"Oh Mi Amour" – 2:33
"Buttercups" – 2:55
"Maybe Laughter" – 2:19
"Big to Do" – 3:04
"All These Colors" – 1:41
"Flower Jargon" – 4:22
"Fare Thee Well" – 2:20
"Carry-On" – 5:01

References

2002 albums
Dressy Bessy albums
Kindercore Records albums